The Mask Mirror is a Thai television program in which guest artists wear masks to conceal their true identities. It aired on Workpoint TV on Thursdays after Thai Literature (15–22 August 2019) and later on after Zodiac (14 November 2019 – 6 February 2020).

The premise of the show involves the public guessing which of the contestants, who are referred to as "Mirrors," have real identities and which have false identities. The program was presented by Kan Kantathavorn.

Panel of Judges

After Thai Literature Series

After Thai Zodiac Series

Episodes

After Thai Literature Series

After Zodiac Series

References 

The Mask Singer (Thai TV series)
2019 Thai television seasons